Name of the Game may refer to:

Television
 The Name of the Game (TV series), a 1968–1971 American drama
 Fame Is the Name of the Game, a 1966 American television film and pilot for the series
 "The Name of the Game" (Grey's Anatomy), a television episode
 "The Name of the Game" (The Boys), a television episode

Music

Albums
 Name of the Game, a 2008 album by Boo Boo Davis

Songs
 "The Name of the Game" (ABBA song), 1977
 "Name of the Game" (The Crystal Method song), 2001
 "Name of the Game" (Badfinger song), 1971
 "Name of the Game", a 1980 song by Status Quo from Just Supposin'
 "Name of the Game", a 1986 song by Cheap Trick, B-side of "It's Only Love"
 "Olé, Olé, Olé (The Name of the Game)", a 1987 song by The Fans

Literature
 The Name of the Game, a 1988 Forgotten Realms novel by Rose Estes
 The Name of the Game, a 2003 comic by Will Eisner
 The Name of the Game, a collection of The Boys comic book series

See also
 "The Name Game", a children's singalong rhyming game